Charlotte Lee, Lady Baltimore (23 March 1678 , (13 March 1678 OS) – 1 February 1721, (22 January 1721 OS), was an English noblewoman, and granddaughter of King Charles II of England and his mistress Barbara Villiers. She married in 1699, Benedict Leonard Calvert, 4th Baron Baltimore, from whom she separated in 1705; she later married Christopher Crowe. She was the mother of Charles Calvert, 5th Baron Baltimore, and of Benedict Leonard Calvert, who was Governor of Maryland from 1727–1731.

Early life
Lady Charlotte Lee was born on 13 March 1678 at St. James's Park, St. James, London.  She was the eldest of at least fourteen children of Edward Henry Lee, 1st Earl of Lichfield (4 February 1663 – 14 July 1716) and Lady Charlotte Fitzroy (5 September 1664 – 17 February 1718), illegitimate daughter of King Charles II by his mistress Barbara Villiers, Countess of Castlemaine, Duchess of Cleveland.

Lady Charlotte's mother was fourteen years old at the time of her birth, having married the Earl of Lichfield at the age of thirteen. Her father was also only fifteen at the time of her birth

Her paternal grandparents were Sir Francis Henry Lee of Ditchley, 4th Baronet of Quarendon and Elizabeth Pope, daughter of Thomas Pope, 2nd Earl of Downe.

Marriage to Lord Baltimore

On 2 January 1699, at the age of twenty, she married her first husband Benedict Leonard Calvert, 4th Baron Baltimore (21 March 1679 – 16 April 1715), son of Charles Calvert, 3rd Baron Baltimore and Jane Lowe.

Charlotte assumed the title of Lady Baltimore in February 1715, when her husband succeeded to the title of 4th Baron Baltimore upon the death of his father, the third Baron Baltimore. The title of Proprietary Governor of the Province of Maryland had been lost to the third Baron during the Glorious Revolution and would be restored to Charles Calvert, the son of Charlotte and Benedict, upon the latter's death on 16 April 1715.

Charlotte and Lord Baltimore had six children:
 Charles Calvert, 5th Baron Baltimore, 18th Proprietor Governor of Maryland, FRS (29 September 1699 – 24 April 1751), married Mary Janssen, daughter of Sir Theodore Janssen, 1st Baronet Janssen and Williamsa Henley, by whom he had three children, including Frederick Calvert, 6th Baron Baltimore, Louisa Calvert, and Caroline Calvert. He also had an illegitimate son, by the name of Benedict Swingate Calvert, who settled in Maryland, and married his cousin Elizabeth Calvert.
 Hon. Benedict Leonard Calvert, Governor of Maryland, (1700–1731). He died 1 June 1732 on his passage home to England
 Hon. Edward Henry Calvert (born ca. 1700), held the office of Commissary General and President of the council of Maryland.
 Hon. Charlotte Calvert (died December 1744), married Thomas Breerwood, by whom she had a son, Francis Breerwood
 Hon. Jane Calvert (died July 1778), married John Hyde, with whom she had three children.
 Hon. Cecil Calvert (born 1702)

Charlotte and Lord Baltimore were separated in 1705. In 1706 Charlotte had an affair with Colonel Robert Fielding, then the bigamous husband of her grandmother the Duchess of Cleveland, and was rumoured to have borne a child by him, born on 23 April 1707.

In 1711, Lord Baltimore brought a Bill before the House of Lords (which adjudicated on matters of inheritance of titles and estates) to confirm his divorce from Lady Charlotte, their financial settlement, and that any subsequent children she bore would be declared illegitimate.

Marriage to Christopher Crowe
Lady Baltimore married her second husband Christopher Crowe (c.1681 – 9 November 1749), Consul at Leghorn, sometime before 10 December 1719. Charlotte was three years older than her husband. This marriage produced five more children:

 James Crowe (1715-1801), married Rebecca Sarah Crowberry (1717-1761)
 Christopher Crowe (1716–1776), married Barbara Duncombe
 Catherine Crowe (1717 – 1782), married Roger Henry Gale
 Charlotte Crowe (1718–1742)
 George Crowe (25 November 1719 – 10 October 1782), married Anne Swift, by whom he had a son, Robert.

Death and legacy
Charlotte Lee died of rheumatism on 22 January 1721 at Woodford Hall, Woodford, Essex. She was buried at Woodford on 29 January 1721. She died intestate and her estate was administered on 4 March 1721 at Woodford Hall.

In fiction 
Charlotte Lee appears as a minor character in Anya Seton's historical romance Devil Water.

Ancestry

References

Sources
 G.E. Cokayne, The Complete Peerage of England, Scotland, Ireland, Great Britain and the United Kingdom, Extanct, Extinct or Dormant, new ed., 13 volumes in 14 (1910–1959)
 Antonia Fraser, King Charles II, Weidenfeld and Nicolson Ltd., London, 1979
 www.ThePeerage.com.pp. 7641,#76403
 Antonia Fraser, King Charles II'',p. 414

External links
www.thepeerage.com Retrieved January 2014

1678 births
1721 deaths
Charlotte
Charlotte Lee, Lady Baltimore
Charlotte Lee, Lady Baltimore
Baltimore
Daughters of British earls